Tony Tim Henriksen (born 25 April 1973) is a former Danish footballer, who played as a goalkeeper.

Henriksen made his debut for Southend United in the FA Cup on 6 December 1997, away to Fulham in the 1–0 defeat, replacing Adrian Clark in the 56th minute after goalkeeper, Simon Royce was sent-off. In December 1998 he played one game in the Hillier Cup for Rushden & Diamonds.

References

External links

Living people
1973 births
People from Favrskov Municipality
Danish men's footballers
Association football goalkeepers
Randers FC players
Aarhus Gymnastikforening players
AC Horsens players
Southend United F.C. players
Holstebro BK players
Sportspeople from the Central Denmark Region